Nilantha Lakshitha Kithsiri Ratnayake (born 22 November 1968), or Nilantha Ratnayake, is a former Sri Lankan cricketer who played two One Day Internationals, in March 1989 and February 1990 during Pakistan tour.

References

1968 births
Living people
Sri Lankan cricketers
Sri Lanka One Day International cricketers
Kandurata cricketers